Loyalty is the second studio album by American hip hop group Screwball. It was released on June 26, 2001 via Hydra Entertainment/Landspeed Records. Recording sessions took place at C Mo' Greens Studio in New York. Production was mainly handled by Godfather Don and Ayatollah. It features guest appearances from Black Attack, Complexion, Cormega, Kool G Rap, Matrix Bars, M.O.P., Nature, N.O.R.E. and Tragedy Khadafi. The album peaked at number 185 on the US Billboard 200. Its lead single, Lee Stone-produced "Torture", made it to #78 on the Hot R&B/Hip-Hop Songs and #2 on the Hot Rap Songs.

Track listing

Personnel

Wilbur "The Poet" Bass – performer (tracks: 1, 2, 5, 7, 8, 10, 12-14, 17, 19), associate producer
Kenneth "KL" Lewis – performer (tracks: 2-5, 7, 8, 10, 12, 14, 18, 19), associate producer
Fredrick "Hostyle" Ivey – performer (tracks: 3-5, 8, 9, 14, 15, 19)
Kyron "Solo" Jones – performer (tracks: 3-5, 8, 9, 11, 19)
Matrix Bars – featured artist (track 2)
Jermaine "Nature" Baxter – featured artist (track 3)
Eric "Billy Danze" Murray – featured artist (track 5)
Jamal "Lil' Fame" Grinnage – featured artist (track 5)
Sean "Black Attack" Boston – featured artist (track 9)
Cory "Cormega" McKay – featured artist (track 10)
Nathaniel "Kool G Rap" Wilson – featured artist (track 12)
Victor "Noreaga" Santiago – featured artist (track 12)
Percy "Tragedy Khadafi" Chapman – featured artist (track 14)
Complextion – featured artist (track 18)
Lamont "Ayatollah" Dorrell – producer (tracks: 1, 2, 4, 7, 11)
Rodney "Godfather Don" Chapman – producer (tracks: 3, 9, 10, 12, 13, 15)
Lee Stone – producer (track 5)
Joseph P. "G.I. Joe" Rivera – producer (track 6)
F Bee – producer (track 8)
Mike "Heron" Herrard – producer (track 14)
Goodie Goodman – producer (track 17)
Edwin "S.P.K." Almonte – producer (track 18)
The Beatnuts – producers (track 19)
Max Vargas – mixing & recording (tracks: 1, 2, 4, 5, 7-9, 11, 14, 15, 17, 18), engineering (tracks: 3, 10, 12, 13)
Dino Z. – engineering (track 19)
Duncan Stanbury – mastering
Jerry Famolari – executive producer, A&R
Robert "Bob" Perry – associate producer
Trevor "Karma" Gendron – art direction, design & layout

Charts

References

External links

2001 albums
Screwball (group) albums
Hydra Entertainment albums
Albums produced by Ayatollah
Albums produced by the Beatnuts
Albums produced by Godfather Don